West Caribbean Airways Flight 708 was a charter flight that crashed in northwest Venezuela in the early hours of Tuesday, 16 August 2005, killing all 160 passengers and crew on board. The plane, a McDonnell Douglas MD-82, registration HK-4374X, was en route from Tocumen International Airport (PTY) in Panama City, Panama, to Martinique Aimé Césaire International Airport (FDF) in Fort-de-France, Martinique, France. The crew, probably under the mistaken belief that the aircraft had suffered a double engine flame-out, did not take the necessary actions to recover from the stall. The confusion and lack of action resulted in the crash.

All the passengers were French citizens from Martinique, with the exception of one Italian, acting as the tour operator. The crew was Colombian. The flight was chartered by the Globe Trotters de Rivière Salée travel agency in Martinique. Most of the passengers were tourists returning from a week's vacation in Panama.

The death toll made the accident the deadliest of 2005, the deadliest aviation disaster to occur in Venezuela, and the deadliest involving a McDonnell Douglas MD-82.

Background

Medellín-based West Caribbean Airways started as a charter service in 1998. It specialized in flights to San Andrés in the Caribbean, parts of the Colombian mainland, and Central America. A few months before the accident, the airline had been fined $46,000 for lack of pilot training and failure to log required flight data. The airline had experienced a previous fatal accident in March 2005.

The aircraft involved in the incident was delivered to Continental Airlines on 4 November 1986 as N72824, which operated it until around 2001. At this point, the airframe was put into storage in the California desert for four years, and eventually purchased by MK Aviation, a United States-based company. On 10 January 2005, the aircraft was transferred to West Caribbean Airways, and registered as HK-4374X, leased to WCA by MK Aviation.

The jet's tail cone fell off in early July 2005 and was replaced.

The captain of flight 708 was 40-year-old Omar Ospina, and the first officer was 21-year-old David Muñoz. The captain had 5,942 hours of flight experience (including 1,128 hours on the MD-82), and the first officer 1,341 hours, with 862 of them on the MD-82.

Accident
Flight 708 took off from Tocumen International Airport at 00:58 local time (05:58 UTC). It climbed initially to flight level 310, and subsequently to FL 330. The aircraft reached FL 330 (nominally ) at 01:44. Five minutes later, the crew turned the aircraft's anti-icing systems back on (having turned them off during the final part of the climb). The system uses bleed air from the engines, and this reduces the thrust they can produce. The aircraft was being flown too high for its weight and the icing conditions it faced.

The captain noticed the reduction in engine output, but he did not realize the source of the problem, so he started a rapid descent as a precaution. At that time, the airspeed was already near stall speed, and the autopilot had already compensated with a nose-up attitude (angle of attack, or AOA) of 5.8° in an effort to maintain a constant altitude. West Caribbean, like all owners of the MD-82, had received an operation bulletin from the planes' manufacturer three years earlier, warning that the autopilot could try to compensate for inadequate speed, even allowing the speed to continue to drop towards a stall situation, without sending a warning or disconnecting; the bulletin advised pilots simply to monitor airspeed during autopilot level flight, but West Caribbean had not shared this bulletin with its pilots. Already approaching a stall condition, the airliner was pummeled by sudden turbulence, reducing the airflow into the intakes of the engines, which reduced thrust even more. The flow of air over the wing of the aircraft became stalled. Although the cockpit voice recorder picked up the first officer correctly diagnosing the situation as a stall and attempting twice to communicate this to the captain, the captain was likely confused by the unusual behavior of the engines, due to the anti-ice system and probably the airflow disruption caused by turbulence. The captain thought he was struggling with an engine flameout, which he told the first officer to communicate to the ground controller, and did not recognize the stall situation; he then mishandled the stall by increasing the nose-up attitude to an AOA of 10.6°, which compounded the drop in airflow to the engines and further exacerbated the stall.

Timeline

All times are UTC. (For local time in Panama and Colombia, subtract 5 hours; for Venezuela subtract 4:30 hours; for Martinique, subtract 4.)
06:00 Flight 708 departs from Panama en route to Martinique.
06:51 Crew reports trouble in one engine.
06:59 Crew sends distress call: both engines malfunctioning, aircraft uncontrollable.
07:00 Plane crashes near Machiques, Venezuela.

Investigation

The Air Accident Investigation Committee (CIAA) of Venezuela led the investigation into the causes of the accident. The French Bureau of Enquiry and Analysis for Civil Aviation Safety (BEA) was assigned the main responsibility for investigative analysis of the flight data recorder and the cockpit voice recorder (CVR), with the United States National Transportation Safety Board (NTSB) also taking part in recovery of FDR data. On 22 November 2005, the CIAA released an initial report (significantly changed by the time of the final report) suggesting that a buildup of ice inside each engine's PT2 probe was partly responsible for the accident. Analysis of the CVR showed that the crew discussed weather conditions, including icing, and continually requested and performed descents, which is the usual response to a low power or low airspeed situation.

Analysis of the debris showed that both engines were rotating at normal speed at the time of impact, which enabled investigators to conclude that the engines had not been previously damaged, and were functioning at the time of impact. Ground scars showed that the aircraft impacted in a nose-high attitude.

The CIAA, which by then had been renamed the Civil Aviation Accident Investigation Board (JIAAC), released their final report into the accident and found the probable underlying causes of the crash to be the result of pilot error. Underscoring the finding listing pilot error as a cause, the JIAAC noted a lack of both situational awareness and crew resource management (CRM), which would have better enabled the crew to properly respond to the stall and the severity of the emergency. The report stressed that the crew failed to operate the aircraft within its normal parameters. This resulted in the crew failing to recover from the stall due to poor decision-making and poor communication between the pilots. In addition, West Caribbean Airways came under criticism: West Caribbean failed to provide its pilots with the operation bulletin from Boeing, specifically addressing the autopilot issue; failed to emphasize CRM in ongoing pilot training; created stress for its pilots by not providing regular paychecks for a period of nearly six months leading up to the accident; and further created stress for the accident crew when the airplane was delayed and almost refused takeoff at their previous stop due to West Caribbean's non-payment of catering and food service fees.

Aftermath 
As a result of the crash, West Caribbean Airways was grounded by the CAEAC just one day after the crash occurred. The airline subsequently went bankrupt in October 2005.

Media and popular culture

Dramatization
The hourlong Discovery Channel Canada TV series Mayday (other titles in other countries) featured the crash and investigation in a season-11 episode titled "The Plane That Flew Too High".

In 2010, the documentary Panamá-Fort-de-France : autopsie d'un crash, [Panamá-Fort-de-France: autopsy of a crash] (in French) by Stéphane Gabet and Luc David, traces the event, as well as the investigation.

A short film, Crossing Away, produced for the 10th anniversary of the Martinique-Panama plane crash, was not released until 2017.

In music
 "On n'oublie pas" [Don't Forget], (tribute to the 152 Martinique victims), 2014, written by Serge Bilé, sung by several artists and personalities including Jocelyne Beroard, Alpha Blondy, Harry Roselmack and Admiral T, to remember this event and to help the AVCA, the association of the victims of the air disaster, to raise funds.

See also

Airborne Express Flight 827, a DC-8 crash where the crew decreased the aircraft's speed until it entered a stall
Northwest Airlines Flight 255, the MD-82's previous deadliest aviation disaster, which occurred exactly 18 years previously
Spanair Flight 5022, the MD-82's third-deadliest aviation disaster, which occurred about 3 years later
Southern Airways Flight 242, a DC-9 (the aircraft type the MD-80 was based on) crash involving heavy weather and engine problems
Viasa Flight 742, Venezuela's previous deadliest aviation disaster
Air France Flight 447, Indonesia Air Asia Flight 8501, Yemenia Flight 626, British European Airways Flight 548, United Airlines Flight 2885, Turkish Airlines Flight 1951, Aeroflot Flight 7425 and Colgan Air Flight 3407, all planes that stalled due to pilot error, leading to a crash. 
Catatumbo lightning, a weather phenomenon common in the area of the crash site.

References

External links 

Civil Aviation Accident Investigation Board
Main text of the final Report (Archive) – Unofficial English translation hosted at SKYbrary – Annexes 3, 6, and 7 of the full report are in English, and are in the original Spanish report and the French translated report by the BEA 
Final Report  – (Archive, Alt, Archive) – Official version and the version of reference
National Transportation Safety Board
Factual report 
Bureau of Enquiry and Analysis for Civil Aviation Safety:
"Accident in Machiques (Venezuela) on 16 August 2005 ."
"Accident survenu au Venezuela le 16 août 2005." (Archive) 
English summary of the final report (Archive)
Profile of the crew  (Archive)

2005 meteorology
2005 in Venezuela
Airliner accidents and incidents caused by pilot error
Aviation accidents and incidents in 2005
Aviation accidents and incidents in Venezuela
Accidents and incidents involving the McDonnell Douglas MD-82
August 2005 events in South America
Colombia–Venezuela relations
Airliner accidents and incidents caused by stalls